The 2002 season was the Tennessee Titans' 33rd in the National Football League and 43rd overall. The team improved upon their previous season's output of 7–9, managing eleven victories. After starting 1-4, the Titans won 10 of their next 11 games. They qualified for the playoffs with a first-round bye, but were unable to reach the Super Bowl, losing to the Oakland Raiders in the AFC Championship. The Titans would not return to the AFC Championship again until 2019.

Offseason

NFL Draft

Undrafted free agents

Personnel

Coaching staff

Roster

Preseason

Schedule

Regular season
Under the NFL’s divisional realignment, the Titans were moved from the AFC Central, where they had played since the NFL–AFL merger in 1970, into the new AFC South. In addition to their home and away games with AFC South opponents, the Titans in 2002 played games against the AFC North and NFC East according to the league’s new schedule rotation. They also played one game each against the Patriots and the Raiders based upon standings from 2001.

Schedule

Note: Division opponents are in bold text.

Game summaries

Week 1: vs. Philadelphia Eagles

Week 2: at Dallas Cowboys

Week 3: vs. Cleveland Browns

Week 15: vs. New England Patriots

Standings

Playoffs

AFC Divisional Playoff vs Pittsburgh Steelers

This was the Titans franchise's first playoff win over the Steelers in four tries, following three losses as the Oilers in 1978, 1979 and 1989, the last of which was also in overtime.

AFC Championship Game

This was the Titans' last appearance at the AFC championship game until 2019.

References

2002
AFC South championship seasons
Tennessee Titans
Titans